Coleophora platyphyllae is a moth of the family Coleophoridae. It is found in Japan.

The wingspan is about 13 mm.

The larvae feed on Betula platyphylla. They create a blackish, rather slender pistol-case, with some whitish fluffs along the lateral line and around the anal flap. It is about 8 mm in length. The larva feeds on the upper surface of the host leaf without making mine.

References

platyphyllae
Moths of Japan
Moths described in 1965